The common nase (Chondrostoma nasus) is a European potamodromous cyprinid fish. It is often simply called the nase, but that can refer to any species of its genus Chondrostoma. Another name is sneep.

Distribution
The nase is found naturally in drainages of the Black Sea (Danube, Dniestr, Southern Bug, Dniepr), the southern Baltic Sea (Nieman, Odra, Vistula) and the southern North Sea (to Meuse in the west). Moreover, it has been introduced to the Rhône, Loire, Hérault, and Soca/Isonzo (Italy, Slovenia) drainages. It is a migratory fish.

Appearance 
The nase has a spindle shaped physique, with a blue-grey metallic-coloured scales and orange tail. It has relatively sharp lower lip. Generally, the fish range from 25 to 40 centimetres in length, and weigh about 1000 grams. However, specimens have been recorded up to 60 long and 3 kg in weight . The maximum recorded life span of the fish is 15 years.

Biology 
This gregarious species is found in deep water with a fast current, often in the back waters of bridges or in rocky outcrops. It dwells near the bottom where it feeds on algae, aquatic plants and invertebrates. Nase fish on the whole stay in shoals.

Protection 

The nase is protected by the Convention on the Conservation of European Wildlife and Natural Habitats.

References

Chondrostoma
Freshwater fish of Europe
Fish of Europe
Fish described in 1758
Taxa named by Carl Linnaeus